The 1997–98 Hong Kong First Division League season was the 87th since its establishment. The season began on 7 September 1997 and ended on 16 April 1998.

First stage

Second stage

NB: Teams take points and goals halved from first phase. GF and GA is rounded.

Championship playoff

Relegation playoff

Final
No final was played as Instant-Dict granted the champion in both stages, and automatically became the overall champion. The runner-up in the Champion Playoff, South China, was awarded the overall runners-up.

References
 www.rsssf.com Hongkong 1997/98

Hong Kong First Division League seasons
Hong Kong First Division League, 1997-98
First Division